Shaimaa Abdel-Latif-Hashad (also Shimaa Hashad, ; born April 21, 1981, in Cairo) is an Egyptian sport shooter. She is a two-time Olympian, and a three-time medalist for the air rifle (AR40) at the African Shooting Championships.

Hashad made her official debut for the 2004 Summer Olympics in Athens, where she placed thirty-third in the women's 10 m air rifle, with a score of 388 points, tying her position with four other shooters including the host nation Greece's Maria Faka.

At the 2008 Summer Olympics in Beijing, Hashad competed for the second time in the women's 10 m air rifle. She finished only in twenty-third place by one point ahead of Indonesia's Yosheefin Prasasti from the third attempt, for a total score of 393 targets.

References

External links
NBC 2008 Olympics profile

Egyptian female sport shooters
Living people
Olympic shooters of Egypt
Shooters at the 2004 Summer Olympics
Shooters at the 2008 Summer Olympics
Shooters at the 2016 Summer Olympics
Sportspeople from Cairo
1981 births
21st-century Egyptian women